Women fulfilled a number of different functions during the Algerian War (1954–1962), Algeria's war for independence.  The majority of Muslim women who became active participants did so on the side of the National Liberation Front (FLN). The French included some women, both Muslim and French, in their war effort, but they were not as fully integrated, nor were they charged with the same breadth of tasks as their Algerian sisters.  The total number of women involved in the conflict, as determined by post-war veteran registration, is numbered at 11,000, but it is possible that this number was significantly higher due to underreporting.

There exists a distinction between two different types of women who became involved: urban and rural.  Urban women, who constituted about twenty percent of the overall force, had received some kind of education and usually chose to enter on the side of the FLN of their own accord. Largely illiterate rural women, on the other hand (the remaining eighty percent), became involved due to geographical proximity to FLN operations paired with force, although some of them did join out of compassion.

The rural women combatants in the Algerian War were referred to as the mujahidat and "left their homes and families to join the FLN armed guerrilla bands, the Armée Libération Nationale (ALN)". They tended to be young, unmarried, and prepared to join the resistance "with or without the approval of their families". The mujahidat also were "social assistants to the rural population in the zones in which they were posted and would give local female peasants advice on topics such as hygiene and education". They also had important political responsibilities as many of these female combatants promoted the FLN by "organizing political meetings with local women".

The urban women combatants were referred to as the fidayat and largely "engaged in paramilitary activities in the urban centres".

Roles

Women operated in various areas during the course of the rebellion.  Meredith Turshen claims, “Women participated actively as combatants, spies, fundraisers, as well as nurses, launderers, and cooks.” Gerard De Groot adds, “women assisted the male fighting forces in areas like transportation, communication and administration.” The range of involvement by a woman could include both combatant and non-combatant roles.  While the majority of the tasks that women undertook centered on the realm of the non-combatant, those that surrounded the limited number that took part in acts of violence were more frequently noticed. The reality was that “rural women in maquis [rural areas] support networks” contained the overwhelming majority of those who participated.  This is not to marginalize those women who did engage in acts of violence, but simply to illustrate that they constituted in the minority.

Female combatants

Despite the fact that destruction of civilian and military targets by women through paramilitary activities included less than seventy women, or about 2% of the total females in the military arm of the FLN, it was these acts, especially during the Battle of Algiers (1957), which received most of the attention given to women in this conflict.

A reason for such attention was that included in the women who perpetrated direct violence against the French were Djamila Boupacha and Djamila Bouhired, combatants in the Battle of Algiers.  Eventually captured, the trials of these women, specifically Bouhired, gained recognition from international audiences. Another reason is that the violent nature of such activities, especially when carried out by women, were much more sensational than feeding and nursing FLN soldiers.

Oral testimonies 
As a result of mujahidat and fidayat not having many written accounts about them, oral testimonies have been the main source in understanding the significance of women's roles in the FLN-ALN and their contributions to the Algerian War. While these important pieces of testimony give a voice to women who were often "excluded from the history and memory of the Algerian War as well as victimized in postcolonial Algeria," there remain many omissions in the oral accounts of women combatants.

Some particularly difficult issues that are often excluded from oral testimonies relate to "marriages in the maquis and the FLN-ALN's control of women's sexuality in the maquis." As noted by scholar Ryme Seferdjeli, "In two interviews with mujahidat (Layla Ettayeb and Djamila Amrane) who married in the maquis, they categorically refused to speak about the circumstances in which they got married; nor would they make any comment on it". Another example of why testimonies of rape and torture of the women combatants in Algeria do not come to light can be seen in the story of a mujahida named Louisette Ighilahriz. When Ighilahriz "published her story admitting to having been tortured and raped during the Algerian War, she received little support from other mujahidat." This can be accounted for by the fact that revealing such violence, especially of a sexual nature, is considered a taboo and reliving such trauma can be extremely difficult for survivors of sexual violence.

Therefore, few women combatants are prepared to publicly admit personal stories of the torture and rape that took place during the war. Further, by revealing accounts of sexual violence and subjugation during the war, mujahidat would be seen as victimized women rather than courageous fighters who were absolute members of the ALN.  During and after the war, the FLN rhetoric was very much focused on spreading a heroic image of the mujahidat, "in order to achieve public recognition" and as a form of revolutionary propaganda, which may have influenced the oral testimonies of the mujahidat. In an interview with an unnamed mujahida she acknowledged that:"It is difficult to write history. There are things we will never be able to tell. I have to admit that I would have difficulties in invoking certain points or details."In another interview with a mujahida named Houria, when the interviewer and historian Chérifa Bouatta, "asked about the nature of the affective and sexual relationships" with Houria's first husband, she immediately answered, "No, we don't talk about that."

Covert operations

In addition to general support tasks, women possessed gender-specific abilities that allowed them to carry out clandestine tasks that would have proved difficult for men.  Though women used these capabilities in both the urban and rural arenas of the war, it was the nature of the urban dimension of the war that contained the highest concentration, both in number and frequency, of covert activities by females.  The best documented example of this is in the Battle of Algiers.  In this battle male FLN operatives, driven underground by the French, stayed out of the public realm, avoiding detention and interrogation, while the women who helped to keep them hidden were able to move about freely and smuggle weapons and other sensitive materials as a result of their manipulation of personal appearance. The manner in which women did this was twofold; first by the religious practice of wearing the veil, which the French saw as above suspicion, or, adopting a European appearance seeming to demonstrate their adherence to French values and way of life. Women like Djamila Bouhired, due to the incapacitation of men, were also charged with carrying out terrorist attacks ordered by FLN leadership and did so by again using changes in dress to their advantage.

The desire to pull off the veil by the French manifested because the Algerian woman was a target of French male lust. To not arouse suspicion, Algerian women used Western-style implements like strollers and handbags to conceal explosives while sporting western attire without any veils.

An attempted bombing was carried out by Yasmine Belkacem, but perhaps the most famous incident involving Algerian women revolutionaries during the Battle of Algiers was the Milk Bar Café bombing of 1956, when Djamila Bouhired, Zohra Drif, Samia Lakhdari, and Yacef Saâdi planted three bombs: one in a cafeteria on the Rue Michelet, one in the Air France office in the Mauritania building in Algiers, which did not explode, and a final one at the Milk Bar Café, which killed 3 young women and injured multiple adults and children. Algerian Communist Party-member Raymonde Peschard was initially accused of being an accomplice to the bombing and was forced to flee from the colonial authorities. In September 1957, Drif was arrested and sentenced to twenty years in the Barbarossa prison but was ultimately pardoned by Charles de Gaulle on the anniversary of Algerian independence in 1962.

FLN and women
"Some historians argue that the leaders and male combatants generally accepted the presence of women in the maquis, seeing them as sisters in combat. Others claim that they were on the whole hostile to the presence of women in military units."

Externally the FLN pursued policies that highlighted women in the Algerian War. El Moudjahid, a publication of the FLN, sought to create the ‘myth’ of the female warrior and to idolize her as a martyr and linchpin in the war.  Articles published, including contributions by women to a series ‘Diary of a Guerilla’, cast the female in a heroic light highlighting her bravery and contributions to the war effort.  The writings of Frantz Fanon also lent themselves to FLN propaganda because he championed the idea that by simply participating in the war women were engaging in an act of liberation. The FLN was then able to formulate a motivation for women based on an “abstract notion of ‘freedom’” linked with strong nationalism as opposed to a goal of social progress, avoiding the need to engage in a discussion of women’s issues because they equated it to freedom from colonial rule.  Publicly, the FLN identified the contributions of women, but avoided promising specific rewards as a result.

Internally FLN attitudes towards women are described in a statement by an FLN commander Si Allal:
“it is forbidden to recruit djoundiates [female soldiers] and nurses without the zone’s authorization.  In independent Algeria, the Muslim woman’s freedom stops at the door of her home. Woman will never be equal to man” 

There existed obstacles precluding the involvement of women, including desire by some men to not subject women to any additional danger outside of the significant risks of simply living in Algeria at this time; the dramatic change, which many FLN members were not convinced could occur, that would be required of women going from secluded home life to active participation; and a general lack of trust in women, especially their ability to keep FLN secrets if captured. Upon entry into the resistance there were additional requirements as well, an investigation of adultery that carried a penalty of death, and a possible test of her virginity.  The involvement of women, especially those who were literate and had proactive tendencies, sometimes made their often-illiterate male counterparts uncomfortable. As a result of this and other factors the FLN enacted a deportation to surrounding countries of these progressive female elements, a large percentage of which were removed from Algeria by 1958.

According to scholar Ryme Seferdjeli, "Women have been reluctant to address the question of marriages in the maquis". While marriages did occur during the war, whether or not marriages were ever forced has not been entirely determined. Many interviewed women combatants were evasive in regards to the topic of marriage within the maquis. Further, within "a few wilayat the FLN strongly encouraged mujahidat to marry" and many mujahidat "who joined the ALN during the war ended up marrying" the male combatants in the maquis. The ALN "authorized or forbade marriages" depending on the wilaya and if at the time the ALN found marriages to be problematic or beneficial.

Historian and former combatant Djamila Minne, who interviewed many former women combatants, explains that:"Beyond those feelings of suspicion and hostility, or admiration and glorification, deep bonds of affection were established, which were the result of long periods spent together and dangers faced together. During the interviews, it struck me that out of 47 women militants who married during or after the war, 38 are married with men militants. Now, for a fighter, to get married with a woman fighter is the best proof of accepting the fight she engaged in and of esteem for what she has been".

France and women

By 1957, largely through torture of captured women, the French came to acknowledge the different roles played by female FLN members including their terrorist actions.  Around this time the French initiated a campaign of ‘emancipation’ directed at Muslim women that sought to draw them away from the FLN.  This included the Plan de Constantine aimed at increasing female education, Ordonnance 59-274 giving women more say in their marital status, public unveiling of female Algerians by French women, extension of the vote to women in 1957, and the symbolic installation of Muslim women in public office, among others.  Unfortunately for the French this campaign, while it did have some successes, was largely ineffective.

Post-war

Scholars disagree on the effect of female participation in the FLN on women's rights after the conflict. For example, Laura Sjoberg and Caron E. Gentry claim that women in Algeria, regardless of their involvement and contributions to the conflict, nevertheless remained in their pre-war subservient position afterward as a result of the prevailing societal, religious, and cultural conditions. On the other hand, Natalia Vince writes that, "to argue that the war years were a period of relative freedom for rural women…in which they had more opportunities to enter into the public sphere and mix with men, which in turn led to either a permanent change in attitudes or a return to male dominance and separate spheres once the war ended, is to adopt an analysis that rural interviewees would not use themselves."

Films
The Battle of Algiers by Gillo Pontecorvo (1966)

See also

Women in Algeria
Women in Arab societies
Women in Islam

References 

Algerian War
Terrorism in Algeria
French Algeria

Gender and society
Women in Algeria
20th-century Algerian women
History of women in Algeria